Serkan Kaya (born 24 July 1977) is a Turkish singer, songwriter and composer.

Career 
Kaya's first album Senden Sonra Ben was released in 2000, followed by Aşk Ne Demek Bilen Var Mı? (2011) and Gönül Bahçem (2015). Gönül Bahçem became the best-selling album in Turkey for weeks. The album's lead single "Kalakaldım" became one of the most listened songs on radio and television and was downloaded numerous times on digital platforms.

At the 43rd Golden Butterfly Awards, he was awarded as the "Best Male Folk-Classic Singer".

Discography 
Albums
Senden Sonra Ben – 2000
Aşk Ne Demek Bilen Var Mı? – 2011
Gönül Bahçem – 2015
Miras – 2017

Singles
"Mesele" – 2014
"Benden Adam Olmaz (Burak Yeter Remix)" – 2015
"Dağların Dumanı (Son Bir Kez)" – 2018
"Tarifi Zor" – 2019
"Yaradanım" – 2020
"Hatıran Yeter" – 2021
"Haybeden" (with Sinan Akçıl) – 2022
"Kaçak" – 2022

Awards and nominations

References 

Living people
1977 births
Turkish pop singers
21st-century Turkish singers
21st-century Turkish male singers